Inchling is a three-act children's fantasy play by American poet, painter, playwright Ira Mallory Remsen. It was performed in the summer of 1922, at the Forest Theater in Carmel-by-the-Sea, California. It was the most popular children's play ever performed at the Forest Theater. It played again in 1928 and 1936 at the same venue. The 1936 revival of Inchling helped overcome an accumulated debt that had taken its toll on the Forest Theater during the Great Depression. The play has been produced by schools and children's theater groups throughout the county, including New York and London.

Summary 

On December 27, 1919, Ira Remsen wrote a three-act children's fantasy play called Inchling, that tells a story of Inchling and his struggle for wings. The typewritten script was 66 pages long. The Forest Theater Society's board chose it for their thirteenth season summer play. It was played for the first time on the outdoor stage of the Forest Theater, in Carmel-by-the-Sea, California, for two nights, from August 19 through 20, 1922, and captured the fantasies of young children. It was directed by Blanche Tolmie. The cast included almost every child living in Carmel playing a "creature of the forest." Walter Flanders played the character Inchling. Rhoda Johnson did the costumes of the children. Richard Johnson did the scenery. Priscilla Gadsen danced the Butterfly dance and trained the children on the dances for the Fire Flies and Dew Drops. Edward G. Kuster (Cello) and Jeanne Burton (piano) played music for the dance members. Thomas Vincent Cator wrote the incidental music. Jack Williamson and Lewis Josselyn were the electric light artists, and Hilda Wallace Argo handled the publicity. Talbert and Winsor Josselyn, and others were engaged in the production. Citizens were asked to lend a hand, to bring oak leaves and maple branches of to the Forest Theater. 

Remsen, who often wore jeans and a broad brimmed hat, camped on the Forest Theater grounds during the tryouts and rehearsals. He rewrote the script to fit with the forest theater, designed the Inchling sets, the costumes, and the lights. He loved working with the children and they loved him. Carmel's master builder M. J. Murphy's daughters Kathleen and Rosalie had parts in the play along with many other Carmel children.

Plot

Inchling is a story about Mr. Inchworm, the owner of a factory that makes green leaves for the return of Spring. Inchling, the son of Mr. Inchworm, fails at the task of making enough leaves because he is preoccupied with his ambition to fly. Subplots include a shortage of green to fill the orders for new leaves; the fears that Fire Fly might start a fire; the Robin can't sing to bring in Spring because of laryngitis; and the terrible and villainous Mosquito. At the end of the play, Inchling emerges from a cocoon and is tranformed into a Butterfly.

The scene is set with moonlight in the forest, with a large cocoon hung above the stage. The set remained throughout the play. There were three acts:

 Act I.
 Evening - Mr. Inchworm's Factory for leaves
 Act II.
 Night - The Encampment of the Terrible Mosquito
 Act III.
 Morning - Played on Top of a Daisy

Characters 

(In order of their appearance)

Act I
 Gyem - Billy Argo
 Wood God - George Dorwart
 Scrub Oaks - Vera Basham and others
 Buckthorns - Mary Douglas and others
 Pine Seeds - Frances Brewer and others
 Head Cutter Ant - Scott Douglas
 2nd Cutter Ant - Ross Burton
 Foreman Ant - Robert Curtis
 Expressman - Wesley Callier
 Wee Ant - Mark Daniels
 March of the Dead Leaves - Christine and Virginia Burton and others
 Spring and Her New Leaves (Mud) - Virginia Burton and others
 Mr. Inchworm - John Navas
 Mrs. Inchworm - Anne Greene
 Lady Bug - Christine Burton
 Water Bugs - John Campbell, Billy Botke, Bobo Norton, Billy Neuman
 Butterfly with Golden Wings - Annette Gundelfinger
 The Terrible Mosquito - Owen White
 Four Little Mosquitos - John Campbell, Bruce Waybur, Billy Botke, Florence Brown
 Fire Fly - Hart Rogers
 Inchling - Walter Flanders
 First Robin - Walter Gundelfinger

Act II
 Sentry Mosquito - Billy Brown
 1st Soldier Mosquito - David Ayer
 2nd Soldier Mosquito - Clayton Leitch
 Sticky Monkey - Louise Gundelfinger
 Bats - Hildreth Taylor and others

Act III
 Spider - Wesley Callier
 Dew Drops - Patty Johnson and others
 Mr. Snail - Edwin Tyler

Reviews

The performance of Inchling had the following reviews.  Theatre critic and author Walter Prichard Eaton called it "the most charming children's play ever written.{{ blockquote  |Ira Mallory Remsen, author of the play, is to be congratulated. Inchling in the regular use of the word is not a play, but rather a fantasy. It is constructed out of a series of delightful little woodland scenes. It is something different from the conventional children's play, in which grown-ups usually play the leading parts. The scenery and customs, all designed by the author, are worthy of special mention. Credit is due to Blanche Tolmie, the producer, for the smooth performance and the training of little actors and actresses. The waits were too long, but this was probably due to the fact that there were so many changes of custom to make.|Belle DeGraft, editor of the Monterey Daily Cypress'}}

Adaptations
On August 3, 1928, Remsen's play Inchling was presented at the Forest Theater for the second performance, this time under the direction of Garnet Holm. Pete Steffens played Wee Ant, Harry Leon Wilson, Charis Wilson, Jane Hopper played Butterfly, and Joe Schoeninger was Inchling. The play was rejected by New York producers after Remsen submitted the play for a theatrical release. The rejection threw him into a depression. He talked about Carmel poet and playwright George Sterling's death as a "glorious finish," who committed suicide in 1926. Remsen did the same on November 29, 1928, at his studio in Carmel-by-the-Sea.

Remsen's musical fantasy play Inchling was published after Remsen's death, by C. C. Birchard Co., of Boston, Massachusetts in 1931, with lyrics were by Irene Alexander and a musical score by composer Thomas Vincent Cator.  

The play has been produced by schools and children's theater groups throughout the county, including New York and London. 

In June 1934, Byington Ford directed Inchling at the Douglas School (now the Stevenson School) in Pebble Beach, California . Katherine Elkins played First Robin, Audrey Ford and Betty Hunter played Mud, and Mary Morse took the part of Lady Bug.

In September 1936, Inchling was presented again under the direction of Byington Ford from September 3rd and 4th at the Forest Theater by the Carmel Community Players. Ruth Austin was the dance director and Mingdon Sheets did a solo number. The revival of Inchling, and accompanied village fair at the theater grounds, brought in a profit of $1,000, which reduced an accumulated debt that had taken its toll on the Forest Theater during the Great Depression years of the 1930s.

In November 1950, the Harrison Memorial Library held an exhibit honoring Remsen with a display of his published works including Inchling, Mr. Bunt, and The Tinsel Angel, programs of performances given at the Forest Theater, and the three-sided stage set to produce Mr. Bunt. Several items on display were contributed by the director Blanche Tolmie.

Inchling was presented again at the Forest Theater from August 10 to 11, 1962, directed by Nancy Lofton. It was sponsored by the Summer Recration Program of the Carmel Unified School District under the direction of Lofton.

See also
 Timeline of Carmel-by-the-Sea, California

References

External links 
 
 Herbert Heron Collection
 Interview with Helen Wilson and Rosalee Gladney
 Inchling Manuscript

1922 plays
Plays set in the 1920s
Plays set in California